The 2000 San Marino Grand Prix (formally the 20 Gran Premio Warsteiner di San Marino) was a Formula One motor race held at Imola on 9 April 2000. It was the third race of the 2000 Formula One World Championship.

The 62-lap race was won by German driver Michael Schumacher, driving a Ferrari, after he started from second position. Finn Mika Häkkinen took pole position in his McLaren-Mercedes and led the first 44 laps, before Schumacher overtook him during the second round of pit stops. Häkkinen finished 1.1 seconds behind Schumacher, with Briton David Coulthard third in the other McLaren-Mercedes.

Qualifying report
Qualifying saw Mika Häkkinen on pole position with Michael Schumacher second, David Coulthard third, Rubens Barrichello fourth, Ralf Schumacher fifth and Heinz-Harald Frentzen sixth. During qualifying Schumacher took pole position for a brief moment, beating Häkkinen's time by 0.025 seconds. Häkkinen's final timed lap of the session however, was quick enough reclaim pole position. In the first 2 sectors of the circuit, Häkkinen was slower than Schumacher by 0.085 and 0.089 seconds respectively. A small mistake at turn 12 forced the Finn to run wide off the track for a moment, and as he exited the final corner onto the pit straight, the car oversteered. Despite these two errors, Häkkinen reclaimed pole position by 0.091 seconds.

Qualifying classification

Race report
As raceday dawned, it seemed that the McLarens were faster than the Ferraris. At the start, Schumacher did not make a good getaway and, in order to defend his position, moved to the left to block Coulthard. As the two tussled while reaching Tamburello, Coulthard had to lift off, allowing Barrichello to get level with him. In the next corner, Rubens was ahead. At the same time, Jacques Villeneuve had a superb start and got past four cars in front of him. Following Jacques were Jarno Trulli and Eddie Irvine in sixth and seventh respectively. All this had allowed Häkkinen to get a 1.2 second lead over Schumacher and a further 1.9 seconds over Barrichello and Coulthard. Heinz-Harald Frentzen retired early on from 6th position with gearbox problems on lap 5 when he pulled into the pits.

It soon became clear that the race was developing into a battle between Häkkinen and Schumacher. Barrichello and Coulthard were dropping away at a second a lap and they were quite a bit ahead of third group consisting of Villeneuve, Trulli, Irvine, Ralf and Mika Salo. At the front, Häkkinen soon began to edge away from Schumacher, slowly but surely. On lap 20, the gap was out to 3 seconds before it stabilized until the pitstops. Meanwhile, Irvine accidentally pushed the speed limiter button, allowing Ralf and Salo to get ahead. On lap 26, over 25 seconds behind the leaders, Coulthard dived into the pits. On the next lap, Häkkinen stopped to refuel with a 3.2 second lead. He was stationary for 7.6 seconds unlike Schumacher who was there for 10 seconds. This nearly doubled Häkkinen's lead, up to 5.7 seconds. Barrichello was the last driver in the top 4 to stop and he came out in front of Coulthard again.

Behind the top four, Villeneuve, Ralf and Salo were battling for fifth, sixth and seventh and left Irvine and Trulli to battle for eighth and ninth. At the front, Häkkinen hit a piece of wreckage which destroyed the front of the floor, making the car more difficult to drive. He recovered and increased his lead back up to over five seconds by lap 39. But then Schumacher began to close in. On lap 41, it came down by a second, after something in the electronics went wrong on Häkkinen's car. It immediately reset itself but Häkkinen had lost two seconds. On lap 43, however, Schumacher had to deal with the Sauber of Pedro Diniz who tried to be a bit gentle and the two nearly collided. Schumacher lost over a second. When Häkkinen pitted on lap 44 with a 3-second lead, Michael took over the lead.

Next lap, Barrichello and Coulthard went into the pits from third. Coulthard's stop was faster, and he came out just in front of the Ferrari. McLaren had won the smaller battle, i.e. the battle for third. Now it was left to Schumacher to get ahead of Häkkinen. Ralf Schumacher would benefit from the retirement of Frentzen and the button pressing issues regarding Eddie Irvine in the leading Jaguar had moved up to 6th would soon retire on lap 46 with the result of fuel pressure problems whilst battling for 5th with Villeneuve. Michael Schumacher came into the pits on lap 49. His stop was short and he came ahead of Häkkinen. There was a massive difference in their in and out lap times, which made the difference. Coulthard still could not match the pace of the leaders, around three tenths slower but he pulled away from Barrichello at over two seconds a lap. In behind them, Salo was hounding Villeneuve. On lap 58, Trulli had gearbox problems and stopped from eighth but would be classified 15th. Häkkinen pushed in the closing stages, but it was not enough to disturb Schumacher, who won from Häkkinen. Coulthard was a distant third, while Barrichello was nearly being lapped in fourth. Villeneuve held off Salo for fifth.

Race classification

Championship standings after the race

Drivers' Championship standings

Constructors' Championship standings

References

San Marino Grand Prix
San Marino Grand Prix
San Marino Grand Prix
April 2000 sports events in Europe